Richard Horton may refer to:

Richard Horton (editor) (born 1961), chief editor of The Lancet
Richard Horton (blogger) (born 1964), police blogger
Dick Horton (Richard J. Horton, born 1949), American golf administrator

See also
Richard Horton O'Dwyer (1858–1922), Newfoundland politician